Jonne is a Finnish variant of the given name John. Notable people with the name include:

Jonne Aaron (born 1983), Finnish singer
Jonne Hjelm (born 1988), Finnish footballer
Jonne Järvelä (born 1974), Finnish musician
Jonne Kemppinen (born 1981), Finnish footballer
Jonne Valtonen (born 1976), Finnish composer
Jonne Virtanen (born 1988), Finnish ice hockey player

It is also the surname of Uruguayan footballer Luis Jonne.

Finnish masculine given names